

Fritz-Hubert Gräser (3 January 1888 – 4 November 1960) was a German general in the Wehrmacht of Nazi Germany. He was a recipient of the Knight's Cross of the Iron Cross with Oak Leaves and Swords.

Awards
 Iron Cross  (1914) 2nd Class (16 September 1914) & 1st Class (9 October 1916)
 Clasp to the Iron Cross  (1939) 2nd Class (24 September 1939) & 1st Class (23 October 1939)
 German Cross in Gold on 8 February 1942 as Oberst in Infanterie-Regiment 29
 Knight's Cross of the Iron Cross with Oak Leaves and Swords
 Knight's Cross on 19 July 1940 Oberst and commander of the Infanterie-Regiment 29 (motorized)
 Oak Leaves on 26 June 1944 as Generalleutnant and commander of the 3. Panzergrenadier-Division
 Swords on 8 May 1945 as als General der Panzertruppe and commanding officer of the 4. Panzerarmee

References
Informational notes

Citations

Bibliography

 
 
 

1888 births
1960 deaths
People from Frankfurt (Oder)
People from the Province of Brandenburg
Generals of Panzer Troops
German Army personnel of World War I
Prussian Army personnel
German amputees
Recipients of the Gold German Cross
Recipients of the Knight's Cross of the Iron Cross with Oak Leaves and Swords
Recipients of the clasp to the Iron Cross, 1st class
Reichswehr personnel
Military personnel from Brandenburg
German Army generals of World War II